The Media Foundation for West Africa (MFWA) is an international non-governmental organization based in Accra, Ghana, and was founded in 1997. It campaigns against violations and attacks on freedom of the press in West Africa. Kwame Karikari was the former chairman of the organization.

Report 
In 2017, the organization issued a report on the accessibility of women to social media and their online rights. It was launched in Accra. The Government of Ghana was claimed to have committed to encouraging the mentorship and interaction of women to ICT issues.

Support 
In 2016, MFWA collaborated with the rep of UNDP in Ghana to train journalists on SDGs and how they can report on the achievement of the goals.

In 2017, MFWA launched a funding project to assist journalists in Ghana in accessing information and generating reports on SDGs. The UNDP supported the scheme in the aim of the journalists playing their role in achieving the goals by educating citizens.

In 2020, MFWA in collaboration with the Embassy of Netherlands in Ghana, organized a workshop for female individuals to improve the rights of women online in the country. About 120 females were trained on how to use social media sites to create awareness on their rights in Ghana. Ladies from Greater Accra, Volta, Eastern, Ashanti, Bono, and Northern regions in Ghana benefited from the training.

The organization also launched a framework to improve the relations between the Ghana Police Service and the media in Ghana. MFWA, the Administration of the Police and other media institutions put a document together. The document was said to be in response to the 'frosty' relationship that occurred between the police service and the media concerning attacks on some journalists.

Honours 
In 2016, MFWA rewarded some journalists for reporting on SDGs. The journalists were from Radio Peace in Winneba, Citi FM in Accra, and TV3 Network also in Accra.

References

External links 
 Official Website 

1997 establishments in Ghana
Journalism organizations
Human rights organizations